Hannah Tinti (born 1973) is an American writer and the co-founder of One Story magazine. She received the PEN/Nora Magid Award for Magazine Editing in 2009 for One Story, as well as the Alex Awards.

Personal life 
Tinti was born in 1973. She graduated from Connecticut College in 1994 and has a master's degree from New York University.

Career
Her first novel, The Good Thief, published in 2008, was a New York Times Notable Book of the Year, and received the American Library Association's Alex Award and the Center for Fiction First Novel Prize. She also published a short story collection, Animal Crackers, which was among the runners-up for the PEN/Hemingway Award. Her novel The Twelve Lives of Samuel Hawley was published in 2017. It was named a best book of 2017 by National Public Radio and the Washington Post.

Works
Animal Crackers,  	Review, 2005. , 
The Good Thief , 2008. , 
The Twelve Lives of Samuel Hawley, 2017.

References

External links

 Official Website
 Interview with Tinti, The Faster Times. May 26, 2010.  Retrieved 2015-02-14

21st-century American novelists
American women novelists
American women short story writers
Living people
21st-century American women writers
21st-century American short story writers
1973 births